Torri di Quartesolo is a town and comune in the province of Vicenza, Veneto, northern-eastern Italy.

Geography
It is north of E70 and west of A31, and has its own highway junction called "Vicenza Est", off the Autostrada A4.

Economy
The airline MyAir, now no longer operating, used to have its head office in Torri di Quartesolo.

Torri di Quartesolo has become an important commercial hub in recent years, thanks to the opening in the 1990s of the shopping mall "Le Piramidi", which attracts shoppers from as far as 30 miles away and has spurred a remarkable residential and commercial development.

References

External links

 Official website